The 38th Infantry Regiment ("Rock of the Marne") is a United States Army infantry regiment.

First & Second 38th Infantry Regiments
The first 38th United States Colored Infantry Regiment served from January 23, 1864 to January 25, 1867.

The second 38th Infantry was first established on 28 July 1866, as part of the Regular Army, one of six segregated, all-black regiments created following the Civil War. It was organized on 1 October of that year at Jefferson Barracks, Missouri, and was stationed in New Mexico Territory and along the transcontinental railroads then under construction. Cathay Williams, the first recorded African-American female to serve in the U.S. Army, served with the 38th during this time, disguised as a male. On 15 March 1869, the 38th was consolidated with the 41st Infantry Regiment and redesignated as the 24th Infantry Regiment.

Current 38th Infantry Regiment
Constituted 15 May 1917 in the Regular Army as Company A, 38th Infantry
Organized 1 June 1917 at Syracuse, New York
Assigned 1 October 1917 to the 3d Division
 15 July 1918 During Second Battle of the Marne earned the nickname Rock of the Marne
Assigned to Fort Douglas, Utah, 5 June 1922 to Summer 1940.
Relieved 16 October 1939 from assignment to the 3d Division and assigned to the 2d Division (later redesignated as the 2d Infantry Division)
Redesignated 8 November 1957 as Headquarters and Headquarters Company, 1st Battle Group, 38th Infantry, and relieved from assignment to the 2d Infantry Division
Inactivated 4 March 1958
Organic elements constituted 26 January 1962
Battle Group assigned 19 February 1962 to the 2d Infantry Division and activated at Fort Benning, Georgia
Reorganized and redesigned 10 May 1963 as the 1st Battalion, 38th Infantry
By 1972, the 1st Battalion was assigned to the 2nd Infantry Division's 2nd Brigade at Camp Hovey, South Korea.
Inactivated 16 December 1986 in South Korea and relieved from assignment to the 2d Infantry Division
Headquarters transferred 28 August 1987 to the United States Army Training and Doctrine Command and activated at Fort Benning, Georgia
Battalion redesignated 1 October 2005 as the 1st Battalion, 38th Infantry Regiment
Headquarters inactivated 27 April 2006 at Fort Benning, Georgia, and withdrawn from the United States Army Training and Doctrine Command
Battalion assigned 1 June 2006 to the 4th Brigade Combat Team, 2d Infantry Division, and activated at Fort Lewis, Washington and Battalion inactivated 16 March 2014
Battalion assigned 17 March 2014 to the 1st Stryker Brigade Combat Team, 4th Infantry Division, and activated at Fort Carson, Colorado

Korean War 
Five members of the 38th Infantry were awarded the Medal of Honor for their actions in the Korean War:
 First Lieutenant Frederick F. Henry, Company F, for actions on 1 September 1950
 Sergeant First Class Tony K. Burris, Company L, for actions on 8–9 October 1951
 Sergeant Charles R. Long, Company M, for actions on 12 February 1951
 Corporal Ronald E. Rosser, Heavy Mortar Company, for actions on 12 January 1952
 Private Miguel Vera, Company F, for actions on 21 September 1952

Campaign participation credit

 World War I : Aisne; Champagne-Marne; Aisne-Marne; St. Mihiel; Meuse-Argonne; Champagne 1918
 World War II: Normandy; Northern France; Rhineland; Ardennes-Alsace; Central Europe
 Korean War: UN Defensive; UN Offensive; CCF Intervention; First UN Counteroffensive; CCF Spring Offensive; UN Summer-Fall Offensive; Second Korean Winter; Korea, Summer-Fall 1952; Third Korean Winter; Korea, Summer 1953
Operation Iraqi Freedom : OIF V, Served in Baghdad and Baqouba
Operation Iraqi Freedom : OIF VII, Abu Ghraib
Operation Enduring Freedom: OEF '12-'13, Panjwai Valley
Operation Freedom Sentinel:OFS 2018-2019
Operation Inherent Resolve:OIR 2021-2022

Decorations

French Croix de Guerre with Palm, World War I for MARNE RIVER
French Croix de Guerre with Silver-Gilt Star, World War II for BREST
Belgian Fourragere 1940
Cited in the Order of the Day of the Belgian Army for action in the Ardennes
Cited in the Order of the Day of the Belgian Army for action at Elsenborn Crest

Unit Decorations

References 

4.  Co. A  2/38th Infantry Regiment , 2nd Inf. Division was located at Camp BLV AND CAMP WALLY during the years of at least 1968-1970.

038
0038
United States Army units and formations in the Korean War
Military units and formations established in 1917